ONE 161: Petchmorakot vs. Tawanchai was a Combat sport event produced by ONE Championship that took place on September 29, 2022 at the Singapore Indoor Stadium in Kallang, Singapore.

Background 
The event was originally expected to be headlined by a ONE Heavyweight World Championship title unification bout between current champion Arjan Bhullar and interim champion Anatoly Malykhin. However,  Bhullar withdraw due to suffering an injury in training, It was announced that Bhullar had surgery on the arm two weeks ago and the bout was cancelled.

A ONE Featherweight Muay Thai World Championship bout between current champion Petchmorakot Petchyindee and #1 ranked contender Tawanchai P.K.Saenchai was expected to the co-main event. They were elevated to main event status in August after the cancellation of the original headliner.

This event has announced ONE Heavyweight Kickboxing World Grand Prix Tournament, There are four-man fighters in the tournament featured current ONE Light Heavyweight Kickboxing World Champion Roman Kryklia, former UFC veteran Guto Inocente, Iraj Azizpour and Bruno Chaves that took place in the semifinal tournament.

A flyweight bout between former ONE Flyweight Championship challenger Yuya Wakamatsu and Xie Wei was scheduled for the event. However, Xie was removed from the bout for undisclosed reasons and replaced by Wang Shuo.

At the weigh-ins, Han Zihao weighed in at 153.75 lb, 8.75 lb over the bantamweight non-title fight limit of 145 pounds. the bout agreed to moved to the featherweight division (145–155 lbs) where Han was fined 30%, which went to Ferrari Fairtex. Wang Shuo came in at 139.5 pounds, 3.5 pounds over the flyweight non-title limit. The bout was later scrapped after Wang Shuo pulled out of the bout.

Results

Bonus awards 
The following fighters received $50,000 bonuses.
Performance of the Night: Roman Kryklia, Tiffany Teo and Rodrigo Marello

See also 

 2022 in ONE Championship
 List of ONE Championship events
 List of current ONE fighters

References 

Events in Singapore
ONE Championship events
2022 in mixed martial arts
Mixed martial arts in Singapore
Sports competitions in Singapore
September 2022 sports events in Singapore